The First McDonald Ministry was the 55th ministry of the Government of Victoria. It was led by the Premier of Victoria, John McDonald, and consisted of members of the Country Party. The ministry was sworn in on 27 June 1950.

*Honorary positions until 11 December 1950

References 

McDonald
Ministries of George VI